Blythipicus is a genus of birds in the woodpecker family Picidae that are found in Southeast Asia.

Taxonomy
The genus was introduced by the French ornithologist Charles Lucien Bonaparte in 1854. The name was chosen to honour the English zoologist Edward Blyth whose name is combined with the Latin picus meaning "woodpecker". The type species was subsequently designated as the maroon woodpecker (Blythipicus rubiginosus) by the English zoologist George Robert Gray in 1855. The genus is in the tribe Campephilini, one of five tribes that make up the woodpecker subfamily Picinae. The genus Blythipicus is sister to a clade containing the genera Reinwardtipicus and Chrysocolaptes.

Species
The genus contains two species:

References

 
Bird genera
Taxa named by Charles Lucien Bonaparte
Taxonomy articles created by Polbot